Biomatters is an applied bioinformatics company that creates integrated bioinformatics software.  Biomatters was founded in 2003 and headquartered in New Zealand with an office in the United States, and users in 125 countries worldwide.

Software 
Biomatters flagship software is Geneious Prime, a suite of molecular biology and NGS analysis tools. In December 2017 Biomatters released a new enterprise software, Geneious Biologics, which is targeted at companies engaged in commercial antibody screening.

Awards 
Biomatters has won a number of awards including:
 2007: Computerworld Excellence Awards from Innovative Use of ICT
2009: Recruit IT Innovative Software Product Award at the PriceWaterhouseCoopers Hi-Tech Awards
2012: Microsoft Hi-Tech Emerging Company Award
 2015: Best of Show Finalist at the Bio-IT World Awards in Boston

References 

Bioinformatics companies
Companies based in Auckland
Technology companies of New Zealand